Totonicapán is a city in Guatemala. It serves as the capital of the department of Totonicapán and as the administrative seat for the surrounding municipality of Totonicapán.

History 
In 1838 Totonicapam was declared an independent republic, in which the adjoining departments of Sololá and Quezaltenango were included. This state existed for two years, and was then again merged in the republic of Guatemala.

Totonicapam suffered greatly in the earthquake of April 18, 1902.

Historically, Totonicapán was known for its hot springs.

Notes and References

External links 

Municipalities of the Totonicapán Department